The list of ship commissionings in 1989 includes a chronological list of all ships commissioned in 1989.


See also 

1989
 Ship commissionings